Nicolò Zen the Younger (1515–1565) was a Venetian Senator.

Nicolò was the son of Caterino Zen, a prominent literary figure of the time. He was schooled in science and the humanities and became an accomplished hydraulic engineer. His political career started with securing the post of Savio agli ordini dell'arsenale (Special Commissioner for the Arsenal) at the age of 23, two years less than the minimum. He was able to purchase recognition of experience for 100 ducats from the Council of Ten.

Although Zen advocated a peaceful approach to the Ottoman Empire, Venice became involved in a war with them, 1537-1540. This led to the defeat of the Venetians  in the Battle of Preveza which took place on 28 September 1538. By the end of the war Venice had lost many of its island possessions in the eastern Mediterranean. Zen then wrote his History of the War between Venice and the Turks which primarily consisted of an invective against those who had called for a war in which they had behaved so ingloriously. The text was not published but a manuscript of it was circulated in his household and survived and is now held by the Biblioteca Marciana.

In 1558, Zen published a map and a series of letters which he claimed to have discovered in a storeroom of the family's home in Venice. The letters and map purported to describe a voyage in the northern Atlantic undertaken by his ancestors,  Nicolò and Antonio Zeno, in the 1390s. Widely accepted at the time of publication, the map was incorporated into the works of leading cartographers, including Gerardus Mercator. Modern historians and geographers have disputed the veracity of the map and the described voyages, some accusing the younger Zen of forgery.  

A portrait of Zen by Titian was discovered in Kingston Lacy in 2008.

References

1515 births
1565 deaths
16th-century Venetian historians
16th-century male writers
Historians of Italy
Nicolo
Republic of Venice politicians